Frivilligt Drenge- og Pigeforbund (English: Voluntary Boy and Girl Association, FDF) is a Danish, Christian youth organisation with approximately 25,000 members as of 2009.

FDF's activities are in many ways similar to scouting organisations. However, there are some differences, including the fact that in FDF children are always led by adults, and that FDF is not a member of any international scouting associations. Instead, FDF is a member of Fimcap, European Fellowship and Global Fellowship.

History 
The Frivilligt Drengeforbund (English: Voluntary Boy Association) was established by Holger Tornøe, a young architect and Sunday school teacher from Copenhagen, and Ludvig Valentiner. This organisation was founded on 27 October 1902 in Frederiksberg, and is Denmark's oldest uniformed youth association. Only boys could become members of Tornøe and Valentiner's Association. In 1952, the Frivilligt Pigeforbund (English: Voluntary Girl Association, FPF) was established with a similar structure and concept but which was instead for girls. In 1974 the two merged to form a joint youth organization open to both girls and boys. After the merger this association was called the FDF/FPF. In 1994, the name was simplified to FDF.

Activities and structure 
Since 1926, the FDF has hosted its National Camp event every five years at FDF Outdoor Center Sletten. The camp lasts 10 days and all members from the age of nine can take part. In 2011, the event attracted about 13,000 participants and more than 500 international guests from FDF's partner organizations took part.
FDF groups are divided by age divisions which are led by adult group leaders. The age divisions consist of the following groups:

 Pulsling: 5 years–0th grade
 Tumling: 1st–2nd grade
 Plit: 3rd–4th grade
 Væbner: 5th–6th grade
 Seniorvæbner: 7th–8th grade
 Senior: 9th grade–18 years old

See also
FDF Outdoor Center Sletten
Fimcap
FDF National Camp

References

Youth organizations based in Denmark
Christian youth organizations
Fimcap